Saint James West Central is a parliamentary constituency represented in the House of Representatives of the Jamaican Parliament. It elects one Member of Parliament by the first past the post system of election. The constituency was first contested in the 1976 general election. The current MP is the Hon. Marlene Malahoo Forte of the Jamaica Labour Party who has been in office since 2016.

Boundaries 

The constituency covers the Granville, Mount Salem, and Spring Garden electoral divisions in St. James.

Members of Parliament

Elections

Elections from 2000 to Present

Elections from 1980 to 1999

Elections from 1976 to 1979

See also
 Politics of Jamaica
 Elections in Jamaica

References

Parliamentary constituencies of Jamaica